Finolhas is an uninhabited island of the Baa Atoll, an administrative division and geographically part of Southern Maalhosmadulu Atoll of the Maldives. The island was previously inhabited and abandoned only during the reign of Sultan Hassan Nooraddeen I for unknown reasons.

It is now owned by The Small Maldives Island Company  and operates as Amilla Fushi Maldives Resort and Residences.

References

Uninhabited islands of the Maldives